The 2017 European Motocross Championship was the 29th European Motocross Championship season since it was revived in 1988. It included 15 events and 6 different classes. It started at Maggiora in Italy on 16 April, and ended at Villars-sous-Écot in France on 17 September. All rounds acted as support classes at the European rounds of the 2017 MXGP.

EMX250
A 9-round calendar for the 2017 season was announced on 20 October 2016.
EMX250 is for riders competing on 4-stroke motorcycles between 175cc-250cc.

EMX250

Participants

Riders Championship

Manufacturers Championship

EMX125
An 8-round calendar for the 2017 season was announced on 20 October 2016.
EMX125 is for riders competing on 2-stroke motorcycles of 125cc.

EMX125

Participants

Riders Championship

Manufacturers Championship

EMX300
A 6-round calendar for the 2017 season was announced on 20 October 2016.
EMX300 is for riders competing on 2-stroke motorcycles between 200-300cc.

EMX300

Participants

Riders Championship

Manufacturers Championship

EMX150
A 5-round calendar for the 2017 season was announced on 20 October 2016.
EMX150 is for riders competing on 4-stroke motorcycles of 150cc.

EMX150

Participants
All motorcycles are provided and operated by Honda.

Riders Championship

EMX85
A 1-round calendar for the 2017 season was announced on 20 October 2016.
EMX85 is for riders competing on 2-stroke motorcycles of 85cc.

EMX85

Participants
Riders qualify for the championship by finishing in the top 10 in one of the 4 regional 85cc championships.

Cancellation
During race 1, Moldovan rider Igor Cuharciuc succumbed to his injuries following a crash. In response the race was red flagged and the rest of the EMX85 championship cancelled.

EMX65
A 1-round calendar for the 2017 season was announced on 20 October 2016.
EMX65 is for riders competing on 2-stroke motorcycles of 65cc.

EMX65

Participants
Riders qualify for the championship by finishing in the top 10 in one of the 4 regional 65cc championships.

Riders Championship

References 

European Motocross Championship
European Motocross Championship
Motocross Championship